State Route 289 (SR 289), also known as North Spring Street, is a short  north-south state highway located entirely in the city of Sparta, Tennessee.

Route description

SR 289 begins at an intersection with US 70/SR 1 (West Bockman Way) in a business district just across the Calfkiller River from downtown. It heads north north through some neighborhoods before passing through some industrial areas, where it has an intersection Sewell Drive, which provides access to Saint Thomas Highlands Hospital. SR 289 then has a Y-intersection with SR 135 (Roberts Matthews Highway) just shortly before coming to an end at an interchange with SR 111. The entire route SR 289 is a two-lane highway.

History

For its entire length, SR 289 represents the former two-lane alignment of SR 111 prior to the new 4-lane freeway being built.

Major intersections

References

289
Transportation in White County, Tennessee